John Burke Shelley (10 April 1950 – 10 January 2022) was a Welsh musician, best known as the lead vocalist and bassist of the rock band Budgie.

Musical career

In 1967, Cardiff-born Shelley co-founded the band Hills Contemporary Grass with Tony Bourge on guitar and vocals and Ray Phillips on drums. The following year they changed their name to Budgie.

Shelley is often compared to Rush bassist/vocalist Geddy Lee, as they both share the position of bassist/vocalist in power trio bands, both have distinctive high pitched singing voices, and during the mid to late 1970s they bore a striking resemblance to one another, with long straight hair and large glasses. Both vocalists possessed a high tenor vocal range, but unlike Lee, who is a fingerstylist, Shelley played bass with a guitar pick. In addition to singing and playing bass for the group, Shelley also performed keyboards on its early albums, including the Mellotron on "Young Is a World" from their second album Squawk.

Budgie's November 2010 tour of Eastern Europe had to be cancelled as Shelley was hospitalised on 9 November in Wejherowo, Poland, with a 6 cm aortic aneurysm. After surgery, he returned to Britain for recovery, but no decision about the future of the band had been made. By the time of his death in 2022, Budgie were considered disbanded or on hiatus, having not performed or recorded since Shelley's hospitalisation.

Personal life and death
Shelley was a father of four children. In a 2010 interview for the BBC documentary Heavy Metal Britannia, Shelley expressed his Christian beliefs and said he had always been uncomfortable with the occult-themed lyrics of bands such as Black Sabbath.

In the final years of his life, Shelley suffered from Stickler syndrome, and on two occasions had an aortic aneurysm. He died in his sleep at the University Hospital of Wales in Cardiff on 10 January 2022, aged  71.

References

External links

 

1950 births
2022 deaths
Welsh rock singers
Welsh rock bass guitarists
Welsh Christians
Welsh male singers
Welsh songwriters
Blues rock musicians
Welsh bass guitarists
British heavy metal bass guitarists
Male bass guitarists
British male songwriters
Musicians from Cardiff